Peter Robinson (born 1952) is Professor of Computer Technology at the University of Cambridge Computer Laboratory in England, where he works in the Rainbow Group on computer graphics and interaction. He is also a Fellow of Gonville and Caius College and lives in Cambridge.

Education 
Robinson graduated with a Bachelor of Arts degree in Mathematics from the University of Cambridge in 1974 and continued with a year of post-graduate study in Mathematics before joining the Computer Laboratory, where he was sponsored by the BBC to work on Graphic Design with Computers under Neil Wiseman and graduated PhD in 1979.

Research 
Robinson worked on computer-aided design systems for integrated circuits in the 1980s, undertaking the physical design of the video processor for early BBC computers as a case study.
He continued with work on self-timed (asynchronous) circuits
and his students Paul Cunningham and Steev Wilcox started Azuro to exploit the ideas in designing low power integrated circuits.

The Rank Xerox Research Centre in Cambridge sponsored several of Robinson's research students in the 1990s to work on video cameras and projection as part of the user interface including Pierre Wellner's DigitalDesk, an early tabletop display featuring tangible interaction and augmented reality
and Quentin Stafford-Fraser's work leading to the webcam.
Further work investigated augmenting paper documents
and high-resolution interactive tabletop displays
leading to the commercial nuVa system developed by Thales.

More recently, Robinson has led a team working on affective computing.
This has included inference of mental states from facial expressions
non-verbal speech
and gestures
together with the expression of emotions by robots and cartoon avatars.
His YouTube video on The emotional computer
has resulted in regular television and radio appearances
and his student Rana el Kaliouby founded Affectiva with Rosalind Picard to exploit the ideas commercially.

Robinson has supervised over thirty research students for PhDs.

References

External links 
 Peter Robinson's home page at the Computer Laboratory
 Computer Laboratory
 web page at Gonville and Caius College
 Gonville and Caius College

1952 births
Living people
British computer scientists
Fellows of the British Computer Society
Alumni of Gonville and Caius College, Cambridge
Fellows of Gonville and Caius College, Cambridge
Academics of the University of Cambridge
Members of the University of Cambridge Computer Laboratory
People educated at King's College School, London